All-trans-decaprenyl-diphosphate synthase (decaprenyl-diphosphate synthase, decaprenyl pyrophosphate synthetase, polyprenylpyrophosphate synthetase, terpenoidallyltransferase, terpenyl pyrophosphate synthetase, trans-prenyltransferase) is an enzyme with systematic name (2E,6E)-farnesyl-diphosphate:isopentenyl-diphosphate farnesyltranstransferase (adding 7 isopentenyl units). This enzyme catalyses the following chemical reaction

 (2E,6E)-farnesyl diphosphate + 7 isopentenyl diphosphate  7 diphosphate + all-trans-decaprenyl diphosphate

This enzyme catalyses the condensation reactions resulting in the formation of all-trans-decaprenyl diphosphate.

References

External links 

EC 2.5.1